Esanthelphusa is a genus of freshwater crabs, found in South-East Asia.

Species
 Esanthelphusa chiangmai (Ng & Naiyanetr, 1993)
 Esanthelphusa denchaii (Naiyanetr, 1984)
 Esanthelphusa dugasti (Rathbun, 1902): Laos, Thailand, Vietnam
 Esanthelphusa fangensis (Naiyanetr, 1987)
 Esanthelphusa nani (Naiyanetr, 1984)
 Esanthelphusa nimoafi Yeo, 2004
 Esanthelphusa phetchaburi (Ng & Naiyanetr, 1993)
 Esanthelphusa prolatus (Rathbun, 1902): Vietnam

References

External links

Gecarcinucidae
Freshwater crustaceans of Asia